The Fol Jazik (English translation: Fake Tongue) is considered to be the first Macedonian punk rock band, founded in Skopje by Vlado Hristov - KRLE (vocals) in 1978. The band members were: Vlado Hristov - KRLE (vocals), Saso Nikolovski - GZLA (drums), Petar Georgievski - PERO KAMIKAZA (bass), Bratislav Grkovic - BATA PANKER (guitar). The band has recorded two songs, "Children of the XXth century" and "Advertisement", and has appeared in several rock festivals in Skopje (Boom Rock Festival, Skopski Rock Festival and others). In a short period of time, they achieved huge popularity in Macedonian and ex Yugoslavian scene. The band is still considered to be one of the most eccentric and controversial bands in former Yugoslav music, with music, stage, energy, and explosivity. In the middle of 1979, they were disbanded.

In 1979, the singer Vlado Hristov - KRLE (vocals) formed a new structure of Fol Jazik, with Vladimir Petrovski - KARTER (guitar), Branko Spasovski - PUMA (bass) and Spend Ibraimi - SPEND (drums). They had many concerts in Skopje and Macedonia and they record 10 demo tapes (but at this moment they are lost) In the end of the 1980 this band has disband.

Fol Jazik left a deep influence over Macedonian punk rock scene for generation of musicians to come.

See also 
Music of the Republic of Macedonia
Punk rock in Yugoslavia
Popular music in the Socialist Federal Republic of Yugoslavia

References

External links 
Fol Jazik on SoundCloud
Dragan Pavlov and Dejan Šunjka: Punk u Jugoslaviji (Punk in Yugoslavia), publisher: IGP Dedalus, 1990. 
Janjatović, Petar. Ilustrovana Enciklopedija Yu Rocka 1960-1997, publisher: Geopoetika, 1997  
EKRAN Magazine interview 
album: History of Macedonian Rock 'N' Roll vol. 1 | track no.1 
World News 

Macedonian rock music groups
Macedonian punk rock groups
Yugoslav punk rock groups
Yugoslav rock music groups